Farhad Najafi is an Iranian film director, screenwriter and movie producer.

Filmography as director

Cinema

Series

References

External links

1987 births
Date of birth missing (living people)
Living people
Iranian screenwriters
People from Nishapur
Iranian film directors